Hydroponic garden may refer to:

Hydroponic Garden (album), a 2003 music album by Swedish duo Carbon Based Lifeforms
A hydroponics garden